The 1986–87 United Counties League season was the 80th in the history of the United Counties League, a football competition in England.

Premier Division

The Premier Division featured 19 clubs which competed in the division last season, along with two new clubs:
Kempston Rovers, promoted from Division One
Spalding United, transferred from the Northern Counties East League

League table

Division One

Division One featured 18 clubs which competed in the division last season, along with one new club:
Newport Pagnell Town, relegated from the Premier Division

League table

References

External links
 United Counties League

1986–87 in English football leagues
United Counties League seasons